Mill Tract Farm, also known as the George Boone Homestead, is a historic house and farm complex located in Exeter Township, Berks County, Pennsylvania.  The original section of the house was built about 1750, with a western addition built about 1790 and rear additions completed between 1790 and 1820. It is a two-story, five-bay, L-shaped fieldstone dwelling in the Georgian style. Also on the property are a -story, stone grist mill (c. 1728); early-19th-century, -story, fieldstone tenant house; large, late-18th-century stone-and-frame barn; stone pig pen; and two-story, stone horse barn.  The grist mill was purportedly built by George Boone, III, grandfather of frontiersman Daniel Boone, who received the original land grant.

It was listed on the National Register of Historic Places in 1978.

References

External links

Historic American Buildings Survey in Pennsylvania
Farms on the National Register of Historic Places in Pennsylvania
Georgian architecture in Pennsylvania
Houses completed in 1820
Houses in Berks County, Pennsylvania
National Register of Historic Places in Berks County, Pennsylvania